Chyatay-Burzyan (Sätäy-Böryän) is a rural locality (a village) in Bikkulovsky Selsoviet, Miyakinsky District, Bashkortostan, Russia. The population was 268 as of 2010. There are 5 streets.

Geography 
Chyatay-Burzyan is located 29 km north of Kirgiz-Miyaki (the district's administrative centre) by road. Sadovy is the nearest rural locality.

References 

Rural localities in Miyakinsky District